Margaret Rose Henry (born June 20, 1944) is an American politician. She was a member of the Delaware Senate from 1994 to 2018.  In September 2017, Henry announced she would not seek reelection to her District 2 seat. Senator Henry earned her BA from Texas Southern University and her MA from Springfield College.

Henry was the first African-American woman elected to the Delaware Senate. During her time in office, she worked to reform the juvenile justice system and helped create a needle-exchange program. In March 2018, she received a Lifetime Achievement Award from the New Castle County Chamber of Commerce.

Elections
In 1994, Henry ran as a Republican to replace Democrat Herman Holloway Sr., who had resigned. Henry won the Republican primary with 341 votes (91%), and won November 8, 1994 General election with 3,641 votes (58%) against Democratic nominee Herman Holloway Jr.
In 1998, Henry switched her party affiliation to Democrat and was unopposed in the general election, winning 4,626 votes.
In 2002, Henry won the Democratic primary with 1,908 votes (71.7%), and was unopposed for the general election, winning 5,908 votes.
In 2004, Henry was unopposed for the general election, winning 10,398 votes.
In 2008, Henry was unopposed for the general election, winning 11,872 votes.
In 2012, Henry was unopposed for the general election, winning 15,197 votes.
In 2014, Henry won the general election with 7,324 votes (87.9%) against Republican nominee Robert F. Martin.

References

External links
Official page at the Delaware General Assembly
Campaign site
 

1944 births
20th-century African-American people
21st-century African-American women
21st-century African-American politicians
21st-century American politicians
21st-century American women politicians
African-American state legislators in Delaware
African-American women in politics
Delaware Democrats
Delaware Republicans
Delaware state senators
Living people
People from Rayne, Louisiana
People from Wilmington, Delaware
Texas Southern University alumni
Women state legislators in Delaware
20th-century African-American women